Gaighat Assembly constituency (earlier called Gaighatti) is an assembly constituency in Muzaffarpur district in the Indian state of Bihar.

Overview
As per Delimitation of Parliamentary and Assembly constituencies Order, 2008, No. 88 Gaighat Assembly constituency is composed of the following: Gaighat and  Bandra community development blocks; Katra, Sonpur, Berai South, Dhanaur, Madhepura and Shivdaspur gram panchayats of Katra CD Block.

Gaighat Assembly constituency is part of No. 15 Muzaffarpur (Lok Sabha constituency).

Members of Legislative Assembly

Villages in katra bolak

Election Results

2020

References

External links
 

Assembly constituencies of Bihar
Politics of Muzaffarpur district